After Dark  is a solo album by Dick Morrissey. Recorded the same year as the Morrissey–Mullen album It's About Time, some of the musicians had been also been associated that group, but although this would appear at a superficial glance to make this a Morrissey–Mullen album in all but name it is clearly not. Featuring Jim Mullen on four tracks, mostly as part of the rhythm section with only an occasional lead spot; the musical direction is quite different, with Dick Morrissey clearly in the driving seat.

Track listing 
 "I Won't Last a Day Without You"
 "March On" *
 "They Say It's Wonderful"
 "Pili Pili"
 "Way We Were" *
 "Running out of Time" *
 "Lou Grant" *
 "Change Partners"

Personnel 
Dick Morrissey – tenor saxophone
John Critchinson – piano, electric piano
Ron Mathewson – double bass
Martin Drew – drums
Barry Whitworth – trumpet on "March On" and "They Say It's Wonderful"
Guest 
Jim Mullen – guitar *

References

Dick Morrissey albums
1983 albums